The Oakwood Academy (formerly Big Wood School)' is a secondary school located on Bewcastle Road, Warren Hill, Nottingham, England. It is for 11- to 16-year-olds and is of mixed genders. The school specialises in business and enterprise and was one of the first BSF Schools to be built in Nottingham with 21st Century facilities.

Previously a community school administered by Nottingham City Council, Big Wood School converted to academy status on 1 April 2015 and was renamed The Oakwood Academy after the oak tree sitting predominantly outside the school grounds; sitting in front of the main entrance. It is now sponsored by the Redhill Academy Trust but continues to coordinate with Nottingham City Council for admissions.

References

External links 
 

Secondary schools in Nottingham
Academies in Nottingham